Heather Coombridge (born 24 April 1953) is a New Zealand swimmer. She competed in two events at the 1972 Summer Olympics. She was coached by Duncan Laing.

References

External links
 

1953 births
Living people
New Zealand female swimmers
Olympic swimmers of New Zealand
Swimmers at the 1972 Summer Olympics
Sportspeople from Hamilton, New Zealand